Princess Sarvath al-Hassan (born Sarvath Ikramullah on 24 July 1947) is a Jordanian royal and the wife of Prince Hassan bin Talal of Jordan. She was born in Calcutta on 24 July 1947, to a prominent Muslim family of the Indian subcontinent.

Family 
Her father, the Bhopal-born Ambassador Mohammed Ikramullah, was a senior member of the Indian Civil Service in the Government of British India prior to Partition. He went on to join the Partition Committee of Muhammad Ali Jinnah, later becoming Pakistan's first Secretary of State for Foreign Affairs and Ambassador to Canada, France, Portugal and the United Kingdom. His last post was as chairman of the Commonwealth Economic Committee. Sarvath's Bengali mother, the Kolkata-born Begum Shaista Suhrawardy Ikramullah, was a writer and one of Pakistan's first two female members of Parliament. Begum Ikramullah also served as Ambassador to Morocco and several times as a delegate to the United Nations. Princess Savrath has three siblings, including the late Bangladeshi barrister Salma Sobhan and the British-Canadian filmmaker Naz Ikramullah.

Her paternal uncle, Mohammad Hidayatullah, was Chief Justice of India from 1968 to 1970, Vice President of India from 1979 to 1984, and served as acting President of India twice. Her maternal uncle, Huseyn Shaheed Suhrawardy, was the Prime Minister of Bengal and the Prime Minister of Pakistan. Her mother's paternal family are direct descendants of the 14th-century Persian Sufi philosopher, Shaikh Shabuddin Suhrawardy. Many of her male and female forebearers, on both sides of her family, were poets, writers and academics including the social reformer Begum Badar un nissa Akhtar, Ibrahim Suhrawardy and Abdullah Al-Mamun Suhrawardy. She lived in all the countries that her parents were posted to, but mostly received her education in Britain, and received her bachelor's degree from the University of Cambridge. She first met Prince Hassan in London in 1958, when they were both 11 years old.

Marriage and children 
Princess Sarvath married Prince Hassan bin Talal of Jordan, in Karachi, Pakistan, on 28 August 1968. They live in one of the oldest houses in Amman and have four children:

Princess Rahma (born 13 August 1969)
Princess Sumaya (born 14 May 1971)
Princess Badiya (born 28 March 1974)
Prince Rashid (born 20 May 1979)

Career and controversy 
Princess Sarvath served as Crown Princess of Jordan for over 30 years. She initiated, sponsored and continues to support many projects and activities in Jordan, mainly in the field of education, in addition to issues pertaining to women and the family, social welfare and health. Much of her work focuses on promoting education about various topics (both locally and internationally), assisting disadvantaged women, encouraging community service and helping people with mental and learning disabilities.

Princess Sarvath and her husband continue to represent Jordan at international royal events, such as the wedding of Crown Princess Victoria of Sweden, and the inauguration of King Willem-Alexander of the Netherlands. In 2013, she rode in the carriage of Queen Elizabeth II at Royal Ascot.

There have been tensions between Princess Sarvath and her sister-in-law, Queen Noor. The tensions between the Queen, who wanted her own son Hamzah to be proclaimed crown prince, and the then-Crown Princess Sarvath were exacerbated by the matter of succession during the last days of King Hussein's life. According to off-the-record briefings by anonymous palace officials in Amman, a rumour was circulated that Princess Sarvath had drawn up plans for a redecoration of the Jordanian royal apartment before King Hussein had even died of cancer. This allegedly occurred while the King was undergoing chemotherapy in the United States and Prince Hassan was running the country in his place. In contrast, other sources state that the Princess only gave orders for some state apartments to be spruced up in preparation to receive a foreign delegation. Still other accounts imply that only a kitchen was renovated for the visit of Germany's then-President, Roman Herzog, who was travelling with his native cook.
According to US-based newspaper Pakistan Link, the theory that the Princess' Pakistani roots prevented her husband's accession has been "much publicized in Pakistan".

She received an honorary degree of Doctor of Education from the University of Bath in 2015 to mark her achievements as a longstanding and influential supporter of inspiring young people.

Organizations 

(Former) Member

 Council of UNESCO's International Fund for the Promotion of Culture
 Council of Foundation of the International Baccalaureate Organization
 International Board of Voluntary Services Overseas
 International Board of the United World Colleges (present)

Patron

 Young Muslim Women's Association since 1972
 Malath Foundation for Humanistic Care
 Jordanian Charity Association for Phenylketonuria
 Jordanian Osteoporosis Prevention Society

Chairwoman

 El Hassan Bin Talal Award for Academic Excellence committee
 National Selection Committee for the John F. Kennedy School of Government Middle East Educational Fellowship

(Vice) President

 Jordan National Red Crescent Society – Honorary VP from 1994 to 2004
 Arab Society for Learning Difficulties – Honorary President since 2001
 Centre for Phonetics Research at the University of Jordan – President

Founded

 Jordanian United World Colleges National Committee; chair from 1981 to 1995
 Amman Baccalaureate School; has chaired its Board of Trustees since 1981

Interests 
Princess Sarvath speaks several languages, including Arabic, English, French and Urdu. The Princess is Honorary President of the Jordanian Badminton Federation and was the first woman in Jordan to obtain a black belt in Taekwondo.

Honours

National honours 
 : Dame Grand Cordon of the Supreme Order of the Renaissance, Special Class

Foreign honours 
 : Dame Grand Cordon of the Order of the Precious Crown
 : Dame Grand Cross of the Order of Orange-Nassau
 : Recipient of the King Willem-Alexander Inauguration Medal
 : Grand Cross of the Order of the Crescent of Excellence
 : Member Grand Cross of the Royal Order of the Polar Star
 : Recipient of the 70th Birthday Badge Medal of King Carl XVI Gustaf

Awards 
  International Red Cross and Red Crescent Movement: Recipient of the 'Abu Bakr Al Sadik Medal'

Foreign awards 
 : Honorary Degree of Doctor of Laws of the University of New Brunswick
 : Honorary Degree of the University of Bath

References

External links 
 Indus Earth: H.R.H. Princess Sarvath El Hassan | Patron 
 The Citizens Foundation: Princess Sarvath El Hassan Visits TCF School
 The National Commission for Human Development: The Pakistan Human Development Fund (PHDF) | Patrons

1947 births
Living people
Alumni of the University of Cambridge
Pakistani philanthropists
Pakistani humanitarians
House of Hashim
Jordanian princesses
Pakistani emigrants to Jordan
Jordanian Muslims
Pakistani Muslims
Bengali Muslims
Suhrawardy family
Karachi Grammar School alumni
People from Kolkata
Recipients of Hilal-i-Imtiaz
Commanders Grand Cross of the Order of the Polar Star
Grand Cordons of the Order of the Precious Crown
Knights Grand Cross of the Order of Orange-Nassau
21st-century Bengalis
20th-century Bengalis
Princesses by marriage
Jordanian people of Bengali descent